The National Conservative Party existed in South Africa between 1954 and 1957. It was led by Bailey Bekker, after he and others split from the United Party.

Five United Party members were expelled after the 1953 parliamentary session, including Bekker and Abraham Jonker, after they had criticised the party's approach to the Cape Qualified Franchise which allowed some Cape Coloureds to vote in South African elections alongside Whites. They believed the party should compromise with the government and allow a separate electoral roll.  They were conservative in outlook and regarded the Unitied Party's new leader JGN Strauss as taking it leftwards. They, and two other members, founded the National Conservative Party in 1954.

The party did not prosper and dissolved in 1957 before the next election, with its members joining the National Party or rejoining the United Party, or retiring from politics.

Conservative parties in South Africa
Defunct political parties in South Africa
Political parties established in 1954
Political parties disestablished in 1957
1954 establishments in South Africa